Cornelis Pietersz Bega, or Cornelis Pietersz Begijn (1631/32 – 27 August 1664) was a Dutch Golden Age painter and engraver.

Bega was born, lived and worked in Haarlem and was the son of sculptor and goldsmith Pieter Jansz. Begijn. His mother Maria was the illegitimate daughter of the Haarlem painter Cornelis van Haarlem. He assumed the name Bega when he started working professionally. He was a student of Adriaen van Ostade, and produced genre scenes of similar subjects, typically groups of a few peasant figures, often in interior settings, or fanciful figures such as The Alchemist (Malibu) or The Astrologer (London).

From 1653 to 1654 he traveled by horse and boat on a Grand Tour with fellow painters Dirk Helmbreker, Vincent van der Vinne and Guillam Dubois through Germany, Switzerland and France. This trip was recorded in Vincent van der Vinne's diaries and gives an accurate view of the art in the cities they visited in those times. His dated works begin in 1652, and in 1654 he was accepted into the Haarlem Guild of St. Luke, dying only ten years later, which according to Houbraken was due to the plague. He was close friends with the Haarlem painter Leendert van der Cooghen. When he died he was buried in the grave of his grandfather Cornelis van Haarlem.

References

Neil MacLaren, Catalogue of the Dutch School, 1600–1900 (National Gallery (Great Britain)//National Gallery Catalogues) (Vol 1). London: National Gallery.  (hardcover).  (paperback, 1994).
Kornelis Bega biography in De groote schouburgh der Nederlantsche konstschilders en schilderessen (1718) by Arnold Houbraken, courtesy of the Digital library for Dutch literature.

External links 
Works and literature on PubHist
biography

1630s births
1664 deaths
Dutch Golden Age painters
Dutch male painters
Artists from Haarlem
Painters from Haarlem